Benna may refer to:

Places
 Benna, Burkina Faso, a town in Boulgou province of Burkina Faso
 Benna Massif, a massif in the region of Guinea Maritime in Guinea
 Benna, Piedmont, a comune in the Province of Biella in Italy
 Benna (lake), a lake in Melhus municipality in Trøndelag county, Norway
 Benna, Papua New Guinea, the capital of the District of Unggai-Benna in Papua New Guinea
 Lower Benna Rural LLG, Papua New Guinea
 Upper Benna Rural LLG, Papua New Guinea

People
 Beonna (Bishop of Hereford), 9th-century Anglo-Saxon bishop of Hereford
 Beonna of East Anglia, 8th-century king of East Anglia
 Benna Namugwanya (born 1967), Ugandan politician
 Benna Moe (1897–1983), Danish composer and musician
 Memia Benna (born 1966), Tunisian politician 
 Anthony Benna (born 1987), French skier

Other uses
 Benna (genre), a genre of Antiguan folk music
 Benna TV, an Algerian television channel